Matjaž Kopitar (born 6 November 1965) is a Slovenian former professional ice hockey player. He is the father of the ice hockey players Gašper and Anže Kopitar.

Playing career
Kopitar began his career with HK Acroni Jesenice in 1983 and played eleven seasons with the club. He played two seasons with HK MK Bled and Klagenfurt AC. He finished his career with HK Maribor in 2003. Kopitar represented Yugoslavia and Slovenia in international competitions.

Coaching career
He coached HK Acroni Jesenice in the 2006-07 season and is the current coach of the Slovenia men's national ice hockey team. He coached the national team at the 2011 World Championships and at the 2012 Div I A World Championship where they won first place.

References

1965 births
Living people
HDK Maribor players
HK Acroni Jesenice players
Los Angeles Kings scouts
Slovenia men's national ice hockey team coaches
Slovenian ice hockey coaches
Slovenian ice hockey forwards
Sportspeople from Jesenice, Jesenice
Yugoslav ice hockey forwards
EC KAC players
Slovenian expatriate sportspeople in Switzerland
Slovenian expatriate ice hockey people
Slovenian expatriate sportspeople in Austria
Expatriate ice hockey players in Austria